Frank Arthur Peterson (born 3 April 1951) is an English footballer who played as a forward.

Career
Peterson progressed through Millwall's youth academy, becoming the first black player to play for the club. Peterson made three Football League appearances for the club, before joining Chelmsford City in 1970. In February 1971, Peterson joined Margate on loan for a month, becoming the club's first black player. In the 1971–72 Southern Football League season, Peterson scored over 30 times for Chelmsford, as the club won the title. Despite Peterson having multiple, lengthy periods out of the game during his time with Chelmsford, he made 302 appearances in all competitions, scoring 146 times. The final years of Peterson's career consisted of periods at Romford, Hornchurch and Billericay Town.

References

1951 births
Living people
Association football forwards
Footballers from Croydon
Black British sportspeople
English footballers
Millwall F.C. players
Brentwood Town F.C. players
Chelmsford City F.C. players
Margate F.C. players
Romford F.C. players
Hornchurch F.C. players
Billericay Town F.C. players
England youth international footballers
English Football League players
Southern Football League players
English people of Ghanaian descent